Rodionovo is a rural locality (a village) in Vokhtozhskoye Rural Settlement, Gryazovetsky District, Vologda Oblast, Russia. The population was 10 as of 2002.

Geography 
Rodionovo is located 69 km east of Gryazovets (the district's administrative centre) by road. Nikolskoye is the nearest rural locality.

References 

Rural localities in Gryazovetsky District